The Japanese scops owl (Otus semitorques) is an owl which is a resident breeder in Japan. It is also found in China, Korea and Russia.

This species is a part of the larger grouping of owls known as typical owls, Strigidae, which contains over 90% of owl species. The other grouping is the barn owls, Tytonidae.

It is closely related to the Indian scops owl (O. bakkamoena), collared scops owl (O. lettia), and Sunda scops owl (O. lempiji). These four species are sometimes considered conspecific, and the combined species is then known as collared scops owl (O. bakkamoena).

It nests in tree hollows. The call of the male is a low sad-sounding 'whoop'.

The owl has also been depicted in art such as Japanese pottery.

References

External links

 Japanese Scops Owl at OwlPages.com

Otus (bird)
Birds of Japan
Birds described in 1844